Franco Maria Ricci (2 December 1937 – 10 September 2020) was an Italian art publisher and magazine editor. Amongst his publications is FMR, a Milan-based bi-monthly art magazine published in Italian, English, German, French, and Spanish for over 27 years.  Ricci is known for having created limited editions honoring particular independent artists, which are characterized by their tinted handmade paper, and black silk-bound hardcovers with silver or gold lettering stamping. He sold his publishing house, Ricci Editore, to Marilena Ferrari in 2007 only to regain control in 2015.

FMR magazine 

The first issue of FMR was published in 1982. The title FMR is made of the initials of the publisher's name and also, when pronounced in French, sounds like , a word with rich connotations that translates as "fleeting" or "transitory". Praised by critics as "the most beautiful magazine in the world", it was a paragon for perfection, presenting noteworthy iconological and art historical studies without being pedantic. Known for its magnificent, large photographs, and exquisite drawings, faithfully reproduced on a black background, the magazine captured many high-profile admirers, including director Federico Fellini who used to call it the "black pearl" and Jacqueline Kennedy, who defined it "the most beautiful magazine in the world". In December 2002, after twenty years from the release of the first issue, Ricci sold the magazine to Marilena Ferrari's company Art'é to focus on his old ambition to build the largest maze in the world, "Labirinto della Masone", in Fontanellato. In 2003 art critic and curator Flaminio Gualdoni replaced Ricci as editor of the magazine. In 2007 FMR was augmented by FMR White, a sister publication devoted to contemporary art. Over the years the two publications featured many notable contributors, including Alberto Arbasino, Peter Bloch, Jorge Luis Borges, Italo Calvino, Umberto Eco, Giovanni Mariotti, Octavio Paz, Nicola Spinosa, and Giovanni Testori. Both FMR and FMR White ceased publication in 2009. In 2015, after completing the seven-hectares wide maze also featuring an art museum and a library, Ricci bought back the copyrights of FMR with the potential intent to resume publication.

Other publications 
Ricci is known for having published the original edition of the Codex Seraphinianus and some of Guido Crepax's books.

References

External links

Ricci editore
Designboom portrait
Designboom interview
Month Magazine interview

1937 births
2020 deaths
Businesspeople from Parma
Italian magazine publishers (people)
Italian publishers (people)
Italian graphic designers
Italian magazine founders
Italian magazine editors